Surinam Airways Flight 764 was an international scheduled passenger flight from Amsterdam Airport Schiphol in the Netherlands to Paramaribo-Zanderij International Airport in Suriname on a Surinam Airways DC-8-62. On Wednesday 7 June 1989, the flight crashed during approach to Paramaribo-Zanderij, killing 176 of the 187 on board. It is the deadliest aviation disaster in Suriname's history.

Investigation revealed significant deficiencies in the crew's training and judgement. They knowingly attempted to land using an inappropriate navigation signal and ignored alarms warning them of an impending crash. The safety issues stemming from the incident were of such concern that the United States National Transportation Safety Board (NTSB) issued safety recommendations to the Federal Aviation Administration (FAA).

Aircraft and crew
The aircraft (named the Anthony Nesty in honor of the Olympic Swimmer) was a four-engined McDonnell Douglas DC-8-62 passenger jet which had first flown in 1969 as part of the air fleet of Braniff International Airways. An NTSB brief shows that while the aircraft was owned by Braniff it was involved in a minor accident in 1979 in which there were no fatalities. The aircraft was sold to Surinam Airways shortly afterwards. The official report into the crash of Flight 764 made no indication that this previous incident contributed in any way to the subsequent fatal crash.

The flight crew consisted of Captain Wilbert "Will" Rogers (66), First Officer Glyn Tobias (34) and Flight Engineer Warren Rose (65). There were six flight attendants on board.

History of the flight
The flight departed Amsterdam Schiphol Airport as scheduled at 23:25 on 6 June. The next ten hours of the flight passed uneventfully. The crew received a final weather report and clearance for a VOR/DME (VHF omnidirectional range/Distance Measuring Equipment) approach to runway 10 but instead initiated an ILS (Instrument Landing System) landing. The outboard right wing then struck another tree, shearing it off and causing the aircraft to roll over and impact the ground inverted. Of the 9 crew and 178 passengers, none of the crew and only 11 passengers survived, leaving 176 dead.

Colourful 11

A group of Surinamese football players playing professionally in the Netherlands and organized as an exhibition team known as the Colourful 11 (in Dutch Kleurrijk Elftal) were among the dead. The team was an initiative of Dutch Surinamese social worker Sonny Hasnoe who worked with underprivileged children in disadvantaged neighbourhoods in Amsterdam. Many people of Surinamese origin lived in the city's Bijlmer district and were isolated from mainstream Dutch society. Hasnoe often found that he could engage the youngsters socially if they saw positive role models that had the same background as they did. He encouraged young boys to join football clubs and noted an improvement in their behaviour when they were playing sports as it gave them an opportunity to interact with their white contemporaries and so helped speed up the process of social integration.

In 1986, Sonny Hasnoe organised the first match between a star selection of Surinamese Dutch professionals and SV Robinhood, champions of the domestic Surinamese competition. The match was a great success and further contests were arranged. The Colourful 11 were to play a match in Suriname in June 1989, however a number of players were denied permission to travel by their Dutch professional clubs. Among the players who stayed back as a result were Ruud Gullit, Frank Rijkaard, Aron Winter, Bryan Roy, Stanley Menzo, Dean Gorre, Jos Luhukay and Regi Blinker. A group of eighteen "second stringers" travelled to Suriname instead. Former Ajax players and Dutch internationals Henny Meijer and Stanley Menzo – who ignored his club's decree and went to Suriname on his own accord – had taken an earlier flight and were spared the fate of their teammates.

Football players killed in the crash
 Ruud Degenaar, 25, Heracles Almelo
 Lloyd Doesburg, 29, AFC Ajax
 Steve van Dorpel, 23, FC Volendam
 Wendel Fräser, 22, RBC Roosendaal
 Frits Goodings, 25, FC Wageningen
 Jerry Haatrecht, 28, Neerlandia, was travelling in place of his brother Winston Haatrecht who had post-season duties with his club SC Heerenveen.
 Virgall Joemankhan, 20, Cercle Brugge
 Andro Knel, 21, NAC Breda
 Ruben Kogeldans, 22, Willem II Tilburg
 Ortwin Linger, 21, HFC Haarlem, died three days after the crash as a result of his injuries
 Fred Patrick, 23, PEC Zwolle
 Andy Scharmin, 21, FC Twente
 Elfried Veldman, 23, De Graafschap
 Florian Vijent, 27, Telstar
 Nick Stienstra, 34, RC Heemstede (coach)

Football players who survived
 Sigi Lens, 25, Fortuna Sittard, would never be able to play football again due to a complicated pelvic fracture.
 Edu Nandlal, 25, Vitesse, suffered a partial spinal cord lesion, but eventually recovered and now walks with a limp.
 Radjin de Haan, 19, Telstar, would play again, but was forced to retire early as he could not reach his former level of performance due to a fractured vertebra.
In 2005, Dutch journalist Iwan Tol released his book about this lost generation of Surinamese players called: Eindbestemming Zanderij. Het vergeten verhaal van het kleurrijk elftal.

Investigation and probable cause
A commission was set up by the Surinamese government to investigate the accident. The results of that investigation are described below.

As a result, although the aircraft was cleared for a VOR/DME (VHF omnidirectional range/distance measuring equipment) approach, the crew initiated an ILS/DME approach. ILS navigational equipment is normally more accurate than VOR/DME equipment, but in this case, the ILS equipment at Zanderij airport, though transmitting signals, was not suitable nor available for operational use. The investigation showed that the crewmembers were aware of this. The cockpit voice recorder captured the first officer saying, "I don't trust that ILS", but the captain chose to use it regardless. He did instruct the first officer to tune the required navigational equipment for the functional VOR/DME approach, most likely for use as a gross error check. 

Because of the unreliability of the ILS signal, the aircraft descended too low, triggering several audible and visual warning signals. The crew ignored these warnings and also descended below the minimum altitude allowed for both the VOR/DME and ILS approaches without positive visual contact with the runway. The crew may have been motivated by the aircraft's low fuel state. The aircraft crashed at 04:27.

The NTSB investigation also discovered that captain Rogers, at age 66, was over the maximum age (60) allowed for a captain on this flight. Additionally, he was not properly approved for operating the aircraft type, as his most recent check had been on a small, piston-drive, twin-engine aircraft instead of the DC-8. Partly as a result of name confusion in his check paperwork, this incorrect check went unnoticed by the airline. The co-pilot had false identity papers and probably also no approval for machines of the type DC-8.  

The "probable cause" paragraph from the report reads as follows:

NTSB recommendations to the FAA
Even though the accident was not under U.S. jurisdiction, the NTSB (National Transportation Safety Board) was actively involved in the investigation because the aircraft was U.S.-registered. As a result of its findings, a number of safety recommendations were made to the FAA. These recommendations were made only to the FAA and not the government of Suriname or its bodies of investigation because the scope of the investigation was restricted by jurisdictional issues.

The following recommendations were made:

 Perform ramp and en route inspections of air carriers operating aircraft under 14 CFR part 129 that are registered in the United States.
 Require air carriers operating into the United States under part 129 to provide the FAA with a list of the names, dates of birth, and certificate number of all captains and first officers operating airplanes into the United States. If pilots are found to have reached their 60th birthday, inform the air carrier that these pilots are not authorized to operate as either captain or copilot under the terms of the operations specifications issued in accordance with Part 129. (Class 11, Priority Action) (A-90-52)
Promulgate rules to regulate United States companies that provide pilots by contract to international air carriers. (Class 11, Priority Action) (A-90-53)

See also

 Controlled flight into terrain
 List of accidents involving sports teams
El Al Flight 1862 - 1992 cargo aircraft crash in the Bijlmer area of Amsterdam
Thai Airways International Flight 311, Air Inter Flight 148, Air China Flight 129 , Pakistan International Airlines Flight 268, Trans-Colorado Airlines Flight 2286 and Northwest Airlink Flight 5719, all CFIT accidents caused by multiple pilot errors.

References

External links
CVR transcript

Airliner accidents and incidents caused by pilot error
Aviation accidents and incidents involving professional sports teams
Aviation accidents and incidents in Suriname
Aviation accidents and incidents in 1989
Airliner accidents and incidents involving controlled flight into terrain
1988–89 in Dutch football
Accidents and incidents involving the Douglas DC-8
Surinam Airways accidents and incidents
1989 in Suriname
June 1989 events in South America